Hotel Petersberg is a hotel and official guest house of the Federal Republic of Germany, termed the "Bundesgästehaus" (the official title being Gästehaus der Verfassungsorgane der Bundesrepublik Deutschland). It is located on the Petersberg, a prominent mountain of the Siebengebirge near Bonn, Germany.

History

In 1834 the area was sold to the merchant Joseph Ludwig Mertens. His wife Sibylle Mertens-Schaafhausen built a summer residence on the Petersberg, and became known as the Rheingräfin ("countess of the Rhine").

At the end of the 19th century the Nelles brothers from Cologne had bought the area and started to add buildings. In 1892 they opened up the eponymous hotel that could easily be reached via the newly built Petersbergbahn, a rack railway that continued in intermittent operation until 1958. In 1912 Ferdinand Mülhens' rack and pinion railway, owner of the 4711 company, bought the property. Under the direction of the architect Heinrich Müller-Erkelenz the hotel was converted during the next two years into a spa. Terraces to overlook the Rhine and a new access route were built in the 1930s.

Seat of Allied High Commission
After World War II the Hotel Petersberg became the seat of the Allied High Commission for Germany. The Occupation Statute was issued here on September 21, 1949. Several weeks later, November 22, 1949, the Petersberg Agreement was signed between Chancellor Adenauer and the Western Allies. The Allied High Commission resided on the Petersberg until 1955, when West Germany gained its sovereignty.

The Federal Guest House

The German Federal government needed to host foreign guests and by 1955 started to rent out the Hotel Petersberg (then managed by the Hotel Breidenbacher Hof of Düsseldorf). When the lease expired in 1969, the Hotel Petersberg quickly ran into economic difficulties and was closed shortly thereafter. The buildings were then maintained only as far as preventing them from falling into ruin. In 1978, the government bought the Petersberg with its buildings from the Mülhens family for 18.5 million DM to develop a representative guest house for its visitors. A five-year reconstruction was completed in 1990 following the plans of Horst Linde. Most heads of states that visited the Federal Republic, while Bonn was its capital, have stayed on the Petersberg. A helicopter pad provides easy access. The fact that the mountain has only one access road facilitates security matters. Renovations took place 2017-18.

After the German government moved to Berlin, the Petersberg continued in use as an official guest and conference house and has been dubbed the "German Camp David." In December 2001 the Petersberg was the place of the first Bonn Agreement. Also its follow-up conference took place here on December 2, 2002.

The Hotel is open to the public and managed by the Steigenberger Hotel Group that was rebranded as Deutsche Hospitality in 2016. Michael Schumacher married his wife Corinna on the Petersberg in 1995. Daniela Katzenberger and Lucas Cordalis got married at the hotel in 2016.

List of conferences on the Petersberg
1949: Petersberg Agreement
1992: Petersberg Tasks,  meetings concerning the European Security and Defence Policy 
1992: Western European Union Council of Ministers: the Petersberg Declaration 
1999: EU summit meeting
1999, May 6: Conference about the crisis in Kosovo 
2000: 15th EU conference of foreign ministers
2001, December: The Agreement on Provisional Arrangements in Afghanistan Pending the Re-Establishment of Permanent Government Institutions (the so-called Bonn Agreement) was signed at the Bonn Conference by representatives of anti-Taliban forces and several other Afghan political parties and groups
2002, December: Follow-up conference to the Bonn Agreement
2005, November 5: "Partnership with Africa" conference
2010, May: "Petersberg Climate Dialogue"
2011, December: Afghanistan Conference
2019, July: Petersburg Dialogue

Distinguished guests on the Petersberg
 1938: Neville Chamberlain, British Premier, during the Sudetenland crisis. He was the first official foreign dignitary on the Petersberg 
 1954: Haile Selassie I, Emperor of Ethiopia
 1955: Mohammad Reza Pahlavi, (Shah of Persia, with his wife Soraya)
 1960: King Rama IX of Thailand
 1965: Queen Elizabeth II of the United Kingdom
 1967: Mohammad Reza Pahlavi with his wife Farah Diba
 1973: Leonid Brezhnev, General Secretary of the Communist Party of the Soviet Union (following his special wish, the Hotel was reopened for several days for his visit. During this time he wrecked a Mercedes-Benz 450 SLC, the Federal Republic's gift to him, on his first drive down the mountain)

After the German reunification in 1990
 1990: Nicéphore Soglo (Premier of Benin)
 1990: Mikhail Gorbachev, with his wife Raisa
 1990: Nelson Mandela
 1991: Boris Yeltsin
 1992: Queen Elizabeth II of the United Kingdom
 1993: Yasser Arafat
 1993: Emperor Akihito of Japan
 1994: U.S. president Bill Clinton and his wife Hillary
 1994: Queen Margrethe II of Denmark
 1998: King Hussein of Jordan
 2004: Mohamed Hosni Mubarak, President of Egypt
 2005: Mikhail Gorbachev, former President of the Soviet Union

See also 
 
 Schloss Bensberg

References

External links 

Information about the Petersberg (German)
 Promotional film (German and English)
Bundesgästehaus Petersberg (English)
Information by Steigenberger Hotel Group
History of the Petersberg (German)

Foreign relations of Germany
Buildings and structures in Rhein-Sieg-Kreis
Petersberg

Königswinter
1892 establishments in Germany
Petersberg
Petersberg
State guesthouses